This is a list of the main career statistics of professional Chinese tennis player Zhang Shuai.

Performance timelines

P = postponed

Only main-draw results in WTA Tour, Grand Slam tournaments, Fed Cup/Billie Jean King Cup and Olympic Games are included in win–loss records.

Singles
Current through the 2023 Indian Wells Open.

Doubles
Current after the 2023 Australian Open.

Mixed doubles

Significant finals

Grand Slam tournaments

Doubles: 3 (2 titles, 1 runner-up)

WTA 1000 finals

Doubles: 2 (1 title, 1 runner-up)

WTA Elite Trophy

Doubles: 1 (runner-up)

WTA career finals

Singles: 6 (3 titles, 3 runner-ups)

Doubles: 26 (13 titles, 13 runner-ups)

WTA Challenger finals

Singles: 6 (2 titles, 4 runner-ups)

Doubles: 3 (2 titles, 1 runner-up)

ITF Circuit finals

Singles: 30 (21 titles, 9 runner–ups)

Doubles: 12 (8 titles, 4 runner–ups)

WTA Tour career earnings
Current after the 2022 Cincinnati.
{|cellpadding=3 cellspacing=0 border=1 style=border:#aaa;solid:1px;border-collapse:collapse;text-align:center;
|-style=background:#eee;font-weight:bold
|width="90"|Year
|width="100"|Grand Slam <br/ >titles|width="100"|WTA <br/ >titles
|width="100"|Total <br/ >titles
|width="120"|Earnings ($)
|width="100"|Money list rank
|-
|2011
|0
|1
|1
| align="right" |235,750
|82
|-
|2012
|0
|2
|2
| align="right" |304,426
|100+
|-
|2013
|0
|1
|1
| align="right" |304,426
|85
|-
|2014
|0
|1
|1
| align="right" |425,826
|70
|-
|2015
|0
|0
|0
| align="right" |173,407
|145
|-
|2016
|0
|0
|0
| align="right" |1,033,120
|32
|-
|2017
|0
|1
|1
| align="right" |843,444
|43
|-
|2018
|0
|3
|3
| align="right" |982,583
|39
|-
|2019
|1
|0
|1
| align="right" |1,661,425
|24
|-
|2020
|0
|0
|0
| align="right" |543,404
|37
|-
|2021
|1
|2
|3
| align="right" |1,020,886
|31
|-
|2022
|0
|2
|2
| align="right" |1,088,085
|24
|- style="font-weight:bold;"
|Career
|2
|13
|15
| align="right" |8,909,447
|66
|}

Career Grand Slam statistics
Seedings
The tournaments won by Zhang are in boldface', and advanced into finals by Zhang are in italics.

Singles

Doubles

Best Grand Slam results details

Head-to-head records
Record against top 10 playersZhang's record against players who have been ranked in the top 10. Active players are in boldface.''

No. 1 wins

Top 10 wins

Notes

References

Tennis career statistics